The Liberty Coalition is a non-profit organization based in Washington, D.C. that connects politically diverse organizations and promotes transpartisan policies related to civil liberties and basic human rights.

The Liberty Coalition is associated with the Liberty and Privacy Network.

History
The Liberty Coalition was founded in 2005 by Michael D. Ostrolenk, J. Bradley Jansen, and James Plummer.

In January 2006, the Coalition received national media attention upon co-sponsoring former Vice President Al Gore's speech, "Restoring the Rule of Law." Former Republican Congressman Bob Barr was scheduled to introduce Al Gore to emphasize the transpartisan nature of the event, however, technical difficulties made Barr's telecast impossible.

Issue areas
The Liberty Coalition has nine working groups which focus on issues they consider to be important.  They include:
 A Federal or National ID
 Financial privacy
 National Security Whistleblowers
 Domestic Spying and Surveillance
 The Department of Defense's recruitment database for teenagers
 Federally supported mass mental health screening
 The use of the material witness statute following 9/11
 Medical privacy
 Constitutional drug policy
 Consumer Privacy

Partner organizations
The Liberty Coalition has numerous partner organizations that span the political spectrum.  They are quick to note that the positions they take "should not be taken as an endorsement by any partner organization unless explicitly stated as such."
A few include:
 American Association for Health Freedom
 Americans for Tax Reform
 Bill of Rights Defense Committee
 Center for Cognitive Liberty and Ethics
 Criminal Justice Policy Foundation
 Downsize DC
 First Amendment Foundation
 Defending Dissent Foundation
 Pain Relief Network
 Townhall.com

References

External links
 Official site
 National ID Watch, a consumer privacy website sponsored by the Liberty Coalition.

Non-profit organizations based in Washington, D.C.
Political advocacy groups in the United States